The  is a long arched "semi-domical" structure in the port area of Wakkanai, Hokkaidō, Japan.

History
In accordance with the 1905 Treaty of Portsmouth, South Sakhalin was incorporated into the Empire of Japan and governed as Karafuto Prefecture. To improve maritime connections between Wakkanai and Sakhalin, between 1910 and 1919 plans were laid for the redevelopment of the old fishing port of Wakkanai, with civil engineer  in charge. A revised design was formulated by twenty-six year-old , a graduate of the Department of Civil Engineering at Hokkaidō Imperial University. Construction of the breakwater began in 1920, with works on the North Breakwater Dome carried out from 1931 and completed in 1936.

The shipping route to Korsakov opened in 1923, that to Nevelsk the following year. From 1938 to 1945 there was a railway station in the Dome. With the end of the war and interruption of ties with Sakhalin, the station closed, and the Dome came to be used for coal storage. By the late 1960s the concrete of the Dome was deteriorating, with the volumetric expansion of the corroding steel used for reinforcement, after many cycles of freezing and thawing, and the action of salts. Reconstruction began in 1978 and was completed in 1981. In 2001, the North Breakwater Dome of Wakkanai Port was among the first assets to be listed as Hokkaidō Heritage.

See also
 List of Cultural Properties of Japan - structures (Hokkaidō)
 Cape Sōya

References

External links

 North Breakwater Dome 

Wakkanai, Hokkaido
Breakwaters
1936 establishments in Japan
Buildings and structures in Hokkaido
Buildings and structures completed in 1936